The Tammaro (Tàmmaro) is a river in southwestern Italy, with a length of  and catchment area of . It rises in the Sella del Vinchiaturo in the Apennine Mountains and is a tributary of the Calore Irpino river. In ancient times it was known by the Latin name Tamarus.

References

Rivers of the Province of Campobasso
Rivers of the Province of Benevento
Rivers of Italy